Blaumilch Canal (international release title: The Big Dig) is a 1969 Israeli comedy satire written and directed by Ephraim Kishon, depicting the madness of bureaucracy through a municipality's reaction to the actions of a lunatic.

History
Paul Smith was the uncredited assistant director. The cast included some of the most prominent Israeli actors of the time in addition to hundreds of extras.

The film was nominated for the Golden Globe Award for Best Foreign Language Film.

Plot summary
Blaumilch is a lunatic with a digging compulsion who escapes from an insane asylum. Of course, he escapes from the asylum by digging his way out. Stealing a jackhammer and compressor, he proceeds to dig-up one of Tel Aviv's busiest traffic arteries, at the junctions of Allenby, Ben Yehuda and Pinsker Streets, in front of iconic Mugrabi Cinema.

Rather than question his actions, the police and city officials assume he is operating under the municipality's orders, and aid him as much as they can. Complaints from local residents, whose lives become a living hell due to the noise and traffic jams, lead to infighting amongst city departments. To speed up the work, so that it can be completed before the upcoming municipal elections, the city sends armies of construction workers and heavy equipment to help the lone jackhammer-operator, turning a mere annoyance into a full-blown disaster.

Hauled before a police commissioner to explain why they attempted to sabotage municipal construction equipment, the residents give a vocal rendition of the noises they are subjected to every day, until the commissioner himself yells for quiet.

By the time city officials realize they are destroying a street without any plans or goals in sight, it is too late: Allenby Street is connected with the Mediterranean Sea and a canal is created. The mayor then declares, in a flamboyant opening ceremony, that Tel Aviv has been turned into the Venice of the Middle East.

In an ironic twist Ziegler, a low-level municipal administrator, is the only one to realize that the 'project' was the work of a lunatic; he is laughed at and himself branded a lunatic. In the final scene, Blaumilch is seen digging up Kings of Israel Square (today Rabin Square), which fronts the Tel Aviv Municipality building.

Cast 
Bomba Tzur as Blaumilch
Nissim Azikri as Yehezkel Ziegler
Shraga Friedman as Dr. Avigdor Kooiybishevsky
Gideon Singer as Police Chief Akiva Levkowicz
Shaike Ophir as the police officer
Mosko Alkalai as Zelig Schultheiss
Reuven Bar-Yotam as Foreman

References

External links
 
 The Cameri Theatre of Tel Aviv: stage adaptation of Blaumilch Canal

1969 films
1969 comedy films
Israeli comedy films
Israeli satirical films
Films directed by Ephraim Kishon
Films about mental health
Films set in Tel Aviv
1960s Hebrew-language films